Eustachian, meaning "discovered by, described by or attributed to Eustachi" (Latin name Eustachius) may refer to:

Anatomy
Eustachian tube, an anatomical passage that links the ears to the sinuses
Eustachian valve, a valve of the heart

Medicine
Eustachian catheter, a medical instrument which became obsolete after the invention of politzerization.